The president of the Bharatiya Janata Party is the chief executive authority of the Bharatiya Janata Party, and fills a number of roles, including chairing meetings of the National Executive of the party and appointing the presidents of party subsidiaries, such its youth wing and farmer's wing. Any candidate for the presidency needs to have been a member of the party for at least 15 years. The president is nominally elected by an electoral college composed of members drawn from the party's National and State councils, but in practice is a consensus choice of senior members of the party. The term of the president is three years long, and individuals may not serve more than two consecutive terms. The president usually does not also hold a post within a government, and party chiefs have resigned the position to assume posts in Cabinet.

After the party's foundation in 1980, Atal Bihari Vajpayee became its first president. He later became the prime minister of India, the only BJP president to serve in that position to date. In 1986, Lal Krishna Advani was sworn in as the party president and has been the longest serving president over three different periods. As of 2022, 11 people have served as the president of the BJP, including Rajnath Singh and Amit Shah who have also served two terms. Jagat Prakash Nadda is the most recent president, having been appointed in January 2020.

List of party presidents

See also 
List of state presidents of the Bharatiya Janata Party
Leader of the Bharatiya Janata Party in the Parliament of India
List of Sarsanghchalaks of the Rashtriya Swayamsevak Sangh
List of presidents of the Indian National Congress

References

Bibliography

External links

 

Indian political party presidents
1980 establishments in India
BJP